Flix Miranda from the NASA Glenn Research Center, Cleveland, OH was named Fellow of the Institute of Electrical and Electronics Engineers (IEEE) in 2014 for contributions to high-temperature superconductors and ferroelectric tunable microwave components for satellite communications.

References

Fellow Members of the IEEE
Living people
21st-century American engineers
Year of birth missing (living people)
Place of birth missing (living people)
American electrical engineers